Branchipodidae is a family of fairy shrimp, one of eight in the order Anostraca. It contains 35 extant species in five extant genera:
Branchipodopsis G. O. Sars, 1898
Branchipus Schaeffer, 1766
Metabranchipus Masi, 1925
Pumilibranchipus Hamer & Brendonck, 1995
Rhinobranchipus Brendonck, 1995

One species, Branchipodites vectensis Woodward, 1879, in an extinct genus, is known as a fossil from the Latest Eocene-aged Insect Bed of the Bembridge Marls, of the Isle of Wight.

References

Anostraca
Crustacean families
Extant Eocene first appearances
Taxa named by Henri Milne-Edwards